Blenniella paula, the blue-dashed rockskipper, is a species of combtooth blenny found in coral reefs in the western Pacific ocean.

References

 marinebio.org

External links
 

paula
Fish described in 1903